Nausinoe conchylia is a moth in the family Crambidae. It was described by Edward Meyrick in 1894. It is found on Borneo.

References

Moths described in 1894
Spilomelinae